Babu Pallassery is an Indian film scriptwriter, dialogue writer and actor who works in Mollywood. His screenplays include the film Maanthrikam, starring Mohanlal. He has written many television serials for Malayalam channels. His best known works in serials are Thaali, Gandharvayamam and Valsaylam. His  serial Kanmani is telecast by Surya TV. He is a recipient of the Kerala Sangeetha Nataka Akademi Award (2021).

Personal life
He is married to Sucy Babu. He has 2 sons, elder Lenin Babu, and younger Indian Pallassery. Both his sons have acted in movies as child artists. His younger son played a major character in the Malayalam movie Idukki Gold.

Filmography

As a Scriptwriter
 Chukaan (1994)
 Sargavasantham (1995)
 Maanthrikam (1995)
 Arjunan Pillayum Anchu Makkalum (1997)
 Charlie Chaplin (1999)
 Summer Palace (2000)
 Bada Dosth (2006)
 Snake And Ladder (2011)

As a Dialogue writer
 Chukaan (1994)
 Sargavasantham (1995)
 Maanthrikam (1995)
 Kanchanam (1996)
 Arjunan Pillayum Anchu Makkalum (1997)
 Charlie Chaplin (1999)
 Summer Palace (2000)
 Bada Dosth (2006)
 Snake And Ladder (2011)

As an Actor
 Bada Dosth - uncredited (2006)
 Kanmani'' (TV Serial) - Madhaven

References

Malayalam-language lyricists
Male actors in Malayalam cinema
Indian male film actors
Living people
Year of birth missing (living people)
Recipients of the Kerala Sangeetha Nataka Akademi Award